Joyce Giselle Palad Ching-Alimon (born January 5, 1995) is a Filipino-Chinese actress, She is best known for her role in television dramas Koreana, Munting Heredera, Anna Karenina, Dormitoryo, Strawberry Lane and Hahamakin ang Lahat.

Biography
Ching was born in San Ildefonso, Bulacan. She finished her secondary education at Makati Integrated Christian Academy in April 2012, receiving a medal and a trophy for the Most Outstanding Christian Character Award. She graduated from  Meridian International Business, Arts and Technology College (MINT College) in 2018 with a Bachelor of Arts in film.

Career
Ching started her television career in 2005 when she joined Bubble Gang Jr.  She made dozens of TV and print ads and played a series of young roles until she was cast as Bea in First Time. Her big break came when she landed the role of young Shirley in GMA Network's remake of Endless Love (based on Autumn in My Heart) opposite Kathryn Bernardo and Kristofer Martin.  She also appeared in the teen romance drama Reel Love: Tween Hearts where she played the role of Ligaya also known as Aya, a nerd girl who speaks with nature. She is paired with Kristofer Martin, her co-star/loveteam in Reel Love Presents: Tween Hearts, Munting Heredera and Ikaw Lang ang Mamahalin (originally played by Sunshine Dizon).

In 2012, she played an antagonist role in Paroa: Ang Kuwento ni Mariposa opposite Barbie Forteza.

In 2013, she starred as one of the lead roles in Anna KareNina with Krystal Reyes and Barbie Forteza and Joyce played as Nina Fuentebella (originally played by Kim delos Santos). After the series, she goes back in an antagonist role in suspense thriller Sunday afternoon show Dormitoryo. She played as Airiz Ocampo, a mean girl in Branwood College that was later on revealed to be a serial killer.

In 2014, she was cast as the main antagonist in the mini-series Paraiso Ko'y Ikaw opposite Kim Rodriguez.  By the last quarter of the same year, she played again for a lead role in Strawberry Lane. She played as Dorina, a soft-spoken girl accused of stealing. Her character in Strawberry Lane died earlier to open a new season. She recurred in the series as a new character to open another conflict. In her new character, she played as Amella, the girl used by Christopher (the antagonist) to deceive Morales' family so the other can steal the wealth of the family. Her new character as Amella is also a cameo role in the series.

In 2015, Ching did her first solo lead role in Healing Hearts. Kristofer Martin, her former boyfriend is her partner in the series while Krystal Reyes, her co-lead star in Anna KareNina is the main antagonist. Her role is Liza, the long-lost daughter of Rachel (played by Mickey Ferriols). The series started on May 11, 2015 and replaced Kailan Ba Tama ang Mali?.

Ching is co-managed by Sparkle GMA Artist Center and Viva Artists Agency. 

In 2019, she came back as an antagonist role in Dragon Lady opposite Janine Gutierrez.

Filmography

Films

Television

Awards and nominations

References

External links
 

1995 births
Living people
Filipino child actresses
Filipino people of Chinese descent
Filipino actors of Chinese descent
21st-century Filipino actresses
Actresses from Bulacan
Viva Artists Agency
Tagalog people
Converts to evangelical Christianity from Roman Catholicism
Filipino Christians
Filipino evangelicals
GMA Network personalities
21st-century Filipino women singers